Mad'House was a French/Dutch/Turkish Eurodance group made up of Mukendi M'Bambi Adolphe (DJ, music producer), Stéphane Durand (producer), and Buse Ünlü (vocalist; born ). They were known for creating cover versions of Madonna songs. The group was only active through most of 2002. They disbanded in October.

Their cover single, "Like a Prayer", was a #1 hit in Germany and Ireland.

History
Mad'House was formed in the spring of 2002, inspired and influenced by the Internet mashup, "You Are Like a Prayer to Me" which featured Madonna and Black Legend.

Their debut single, "Like a Prayer", sold many copies throughout Europe. Mad'House later made "Into the Groove" and "Holiday", two more Madonna cover-based singles. Intent on capitalizing on the Netherlands-based success of their debut "Like a Prayer" single, Mad'House eventually went on tour throughout Europe.

On 3 September 2002 Mad'House released their debut and only studio album Absolutely Mad.

In October 2002, Mad'House began touring but never went outside Europe. After their last concert, Buse Ünlü decided to leave, phase out of her career, and move to motherhood due to the early birth of her son, Damian Angelo Geronimo Virgilio, on 17 August the same year. Mad'House disbanded sometime in late 2002.

Discography

Studio albums

Singles

References

External links
 http://www.discogs.com/artist/Mad%27house - Biography and discography

French Eurodance groups
Musical tributes to Madonna